Raiamas nigeriensis is a species of cyprinid fish in the genus Raiamas.

References

Raiamas
Fish described in 1959